The Shire of Chittering is a local government area in the Wheatbelt region of Western Australia, covering an area of about  just beyond the northeastern fringe of the Perth metropolitan area, generally along and east of the Great Northern Highway. Its seat of government is the town of Bindoon.

History

It was established as the Chittering Brook Road District on 10 January 1896, but was renamed the Chittering Road District on 7 February that year. On 1 July 1961, it became a shire following the enactment of the Local Government Act 1960, which reformed all remaining road districts into shires.

Wards
On 3 May 2003, wards were abolished throughout the shire, and the 7 councillors represent all residents in the shire.

Prior to this, the ward system was as follows:
 Bindoon Ward (3 councillors)
 Chittering Ward (2 councillors)
 Muchea Ward (1 councillor)
 Wannamal Ward (1 councillor)

Towns and localities
The towns and localities of the Shire of Chittering with population and size figures based on the most recent Australian census:

Population

Heritage-listed places

As of 2023, 148 places are heritage-listed in the Shire of Chittering, of which three are on the State Register of Heritage Places.

References

External links
 

Chittering